James Patrick Vowles (born 20 June 1979) is a British motorsport engineer and Team Principal of Williams Racing since 20 February 2023. He was the chief strategist at Mercedes-AMG Petronas Formula One Team from 2010-2023.

Vowles has worked in many Formula One teams as a race engineer and strategist and enjoyed success. With two different Formula One teams, he has won nine Constructors' Championships and over 100 Grands Prix. Vowles was responsible for the Brawn GP race strategy, which was critical to the team's championship-winning 2009 season. After working with the championship-winning Brawn GP, Vowles stayed with the team after its sale to Mercedes in 2010.

Career 
Vowles started his Formula 1 career as an engineer at British American Racing and Honda Racing F1 Team. He was promoted to race strategist at Brawn GP after the team was saved by a management buyout of the Honda Racing F1 team led by Ross Brawn. He was instrumental in the team's championship-winning 2009 season. The team was later bought by Mercedes in 2010.

Since 20 February 2023, he is the Team Principal of Williams Grand Prix Engineering.

Education
Vowles attended the International School of Geneva, graduating in 1997. He went on to the University of East Anglia, obtaining a degree in computer science in 2000, followed by a master's degree in Motorsport Engineering and Management from Cranfield University in 2001, receiving the Prodrive Award of Excellence.

References

Living people
1979 births
International School of Geneva alumni
Alumni of the University of East Anglia
Alumni of Cranfield University
English motorsport people
Formula One team principals
Formula One engineers
English engineers
Mercedes-Benz in Formula One